Morris Kiruga (born in June 1990), popularly know simply as M., is a Kenyan non-fiction writer, researcher, and blogger. He is most renowned for his work on Owaahh.com, a content site that runs longform, investigative pieces on various topics, and various sites such as Quora. He writes mostly on little-known, quirky and bizarre stories, and uses history as an anchor to most of his analysis and writing.

Kiruga's blog has twice won the Best Topical Blog at the annual BAKE (Bloggers Association of Kenya) Awards for 2017 and 2018. He also writes for numerous publications on a wide variety of topics including history, business, crime, travel, and culture. His work on Owaahh.com was the inspiration for the theatre show Too Early for Birds, whose name is also inspired by the original title of his blog "Too Late for Worms."

Although Kiruga writes regularly on politics and religion, he is an avowed atheist and abstainer from electoral politics.

References

1990 births
Living people
Kenyan bloggers